The Deceased Correa (in Spanish  La Difunta Correa) is a semi-pagan legendary figure in folk-religion, for which a number of people in Argentina and Chile, especially among the popular classes, feel a great devotion. It has spread, in a limited way, to neighbouring countries such as Uruguay. Every year since its inception in 1840, miracles are said to have occurred at the shrine of La Difunta Correa, and thousands of people have visited there to pay their respects. The shrine is situated in the small town of Vallecito, 1160 km from Buenos Aires and 63 km from the city of San Juan.

Birth of a popular saint
According to popular legend, the husband of Deolinda Correa was forcibly recruited around the year 1840, during the Argentine civil wars. When he became sick, he was abandoned by the Montoneras [partisans]. In an attempt to reach her sick husband, Deolinda took her baby and followed the tracks of the Montoneras through the desert of San Juan Province. When her supplies ran out, she died. Her body was found days later by gauchos who were driving cattle through. They were astonished when they saw the dead woman's baby was still alive, feeding from her  "miraculously" ever-full breast. The men buried her body in present-day Vallecito in the Caucete Department of San Juan, and took her baby with them.

Sanctuary

Once the folk tale became known, the inhabitants of the nearby areas started visiting Deolinda Correa's grave, building after time an oratory that slowly became a sanctuary.

The cultus to the Difunta Correa is that of an unofficial popular saint, not recognised by the Catholic Church. Her devout followers believe her to perform miracles and intercede for the living. The survival of her child would have been her first miracle.

Cattle keepers first, then truck drivers, disseminated the figure of the Difunta, creating wayside shrines in many roads throughout the country, with images and sculptures of the Deceased. They there leave bottles of water as votive offerings, "to calm her eternal thirst".

Since the 1940s her sanctuary at Vallecito, at first merely a cross on the top of a hill, has been transformed into a small town in which there are several votive chapels (17 as of 2005), full of offerings. The chapels are donated by her followers, whose names are engraved on plates fixed to the doors.

In the chapel located on the top of the hill there is a life-size statue depicting the Difunta lying face to the heavens, with her child at her breast. The sanctuaries are segregated by themes. For instance, one of the chapels is full of wedding dresses offered to the Difunta by women whose prayers to get married were fulfilled. Car registrations and scale-model houses can be found all around the hill to the main sanctuary.

Visits to the Difunta Correa's Vallecito shrine take place during the whole year, but they are more numerous during Easter or at All-Souls' Day (2 November) and on dates special to truck drivers and gauchos, mostly in summer. On such occasions, crowds of 200,000 people have been claimed.

See also
Religion in Argentina#Popular cults
Miguel Ángel Gaitán

References

"The Legend of Deolinda Correa Unofficial saint of the desert", Joe Kissell, Interesting Thing of the Day, 26 January 2005

External links

Difunta Correa's official site  (Spanish)
Difunta Correa: Dictionary of Myths and Legends (Spanish)
"Cultures of Devotion by Frank Graziano", academic website with images relating to Difunto Correa and other Spanish American folk saints. (English)

Folk saints
Religion in Argentina
San Juan Province, Argentina
Argentine legends